is a Japanese softball player who won the gold medal at the 2008 Summer Olympics and the 2020 Summer Olympics.

At Beijing, Yamada hit .344 in the tournament while belting two home runs and driving in five for Japan. In the gold medal game she went 2-3, including a solo shot off Cat Osterman.

References

1984 births
Japanese softball players
Living people
Asian Games gold medalists for Japan
Asian Games medalists in softball
Olympic softball players of Japan
Olympic medalists in softball
Olympic gold medalists for Japan
Olympic bronze medalists for Japan
Softball players at the 2004 Summer Olympics
Softball players at the 2008 Summer Olympics
Softball players at the 2020 Summer Olympics
Medalists at the 2004 Summer Olympics
Medalists at the 2008 Summer Olympics
Medalists at the 2020 Summer Olympics
Softball players at the 2006 Asian Games
Softball players at the 2010 Asian Games
Softball players at the 2014 Asian Games
Softball players at the 2018 Asian Games
Medalists at the 2006 Asian Games
Medalists at the 2010 Asian Games
Medalists at the 2014 Asian Games
Medalists at the 2018 Asian Games
21st-century Japanese women